Masoud Khamis Hassan Rahman (born 11 September 1974) is a Qatari sprinter. He competed in the men's 4 × 400 metres relay at the 1992 Summer Olympics.

References

1974 births
Living people
Athletes (track and field) at the 1992 Summer Olympics
Qatari male sprinters
Olympic athletes of Qatar
Place of birth missing (living people)
Asian Games medalists in athletics (track and field)
Asian Games bronze medalists for Qatar
Athletes (track and field) at the 1994 Asian Games
Athletes (track and field) at the 1998 Asian Games
Medalists at the 1994 Asian Games